The DinoHunters is an advertisement-supported first-person shooter and machinima series created by Kuma Reality Games. Using Valve's Source for its engine, The Dinohunters is distributed in free downloadable episodes for the PC. The first episode was released in 2006 through Kuma Reality Games' game client. Accompanying comedic machinima movies were also created to bring the player closer to the world of The DinoHunters, as well as advertise for The Dinohunters real life sponsors such as Schick, which was replaced later by Jeep (in levels, there are S.U.V.s that have license plates that say Jeep on them).

The story of The DinoHunters is centered on a fictitious reality show on the Total Hunting Channel and sends a crew of washed up celebrities into the past to hunt dinosaurs for sport and big ratings. The crew consists of Australian stunt-man and actor Roger Wallaby, country singer Harlan Davis, native New Yorker Shaw, and their sexpot producer Candace "Candy" Spencer.

The DinoHunters is one of the pioneers in the advergaming space of the video game industry. For its first episodes Kuma Reality Games partnered with Schick to promote its Schick Quattro Razor. Kuma Reality Games uses partnerships like this to also keep their other published games free: Kuma\War and The History Channel's ShootOut!: The Game.

Gameplay
The DinoHunters is a first-person shooter that uses Valve's Source engine. Featuring single- and multiplayer modes, the game features a variety of different weapons and enemies for the player to encounter. The DinoHunters currently features 6 playable episodes and 6 machinima episodes. New free episodes are released periodically.

Machinima
Along with the game, The DinoHunters is also a machinima series.

References

External links
The DinoHunters official website
Kuma Reality Games

2006 video games
Advergames
Dinosaurs in video games
Episodic video games
First-person shooters
Machinima works
Windows games
Windows-only games
Windows-only freeware games
Source (game engine) games
Video games developed in the United States